The National Minimum Wage Regulations 2015 (SI 2015/6221) are a statutory instrument under the National Minimum Wage Act 1998 that elaborate rules on how to calculate whether someone is being paid the minimum wage, who gets it, and how to enforce it.

Contents

See also

UK labour law
Tax Credits and Child tax credit, Working tax credit
Wage regulation

Notes

References

External links

United Kingdom labour law
Statutory Instruments of the United Kingdom
2015 in British law
2015 in labor relations